NFPA 70E, titled Standard for Electrical Safety in the Workplace, is a standard of the National Fire Protection Association (NFPA). The document covers electrical safety requirements for employees. The NFPA is best known for publishing the National Electrical Code (NFPA 70).

Purpose
NFPA 70E addresses employee workplace electrical safety requirements. The standard focuses on practical safeguards that also allow workers to be productive within their job functions. Specifically, the standard covers the safety requirements for the following:
 Electrical conductors and equipment installed within or on buildings or other structures, including mobile homes, recreational vehicles, and other premises (yards, carnivals, parking lots, and industrial substations)
 Conductors that connect installations to a supply of electricity
Not covered are - electrical installations in marine, aircraft, auto vehicles, communications and electrical utilities.

Key principles covered are JSA/JHA/AHA procedures to ascertain shock protection boundaries, arc flash incident energy expressed in calories/cm2, lockout-tagout, and personal protective equipment. While the various OSHA, ASTM, IEEE and NEC standard provide guidelines for performance, NFPA 70E addresses practices and is widely considered as the de facto standard for Electrical Safety in the Workplace.

Practices include 
- staging a "safe work zone" with boundaries, barricades, signs and attendants.
- proper body positioning to reduce ergonomic risk, use of rescue hooks in Medium Voltage switching.
- human factor analysis, written procedures to reduce incidents not otherwise imminent from above.

See also
 Electrical engineering
 High-voltage hazards
 Arc Flash

Other NFPA standards
 NFPA 70 — National Electrical Code (NEC)
 NFPA 70B — Recommended Practice for Electrical Equipment Maintenance
 NFPA 72 — National Fire Alarm Code
 NFPA 704 — Standard System for the Identification of the Hazards of Materials for Emergency Response
 NFPA 853 — Standard for the installation of stationary fuel cell power systems
 NFPA 921 — Guide for Fire and Explosion Investigations
 NFPA 101 — Life Safety Code
 NFPA 1123 — Code for Outdoor Firework Displays
 NFPA 1901 — Standard for Automotive Fire Apparatus

References

External links
 NFPA 70E: Standard for Electrical Safety in the Workplace

Electrical safety
NFPA Standards